Emergency 4: Global Fighters for Life (known as 911: First Responders in North America) is a simulation video game developed by German studio Sixteen Tons Entertainment allowing users to manage emergency services on a variety of accident and/or accident scenes.

Gameplay
Directed by their supervisor, the player assumes the role of an incident commander, and is charged with managing a number of vehicles and staff from the fire department, medical rescue, police, and technical services. Progression has been expanded, with a mandatory free-play interlude that involves completing certain objectives.

The game includes 20 missions, as well as the ability to manage a team of emergency response vehicles and professionals.

Emergency 4 boasts several improvements in user-friendliness over previous games in the Emergency series. For instance, it is possible to dispatch multiple vehicles at the same time and order them to arrive at a specific location. Casualties, criminals and fires are now properly marked on the map, and a counter now indicates the amount of casualties still present in the area. Doctors, firefighters and marksmen have better automation.

A deluxe release includes three extra oversea missions and support for voice commands.

See also
 Emergency (video game series)

References

External links
 

Emergency simulation
Medical video games
Europe-exclusive video games
North America-exclusive video games
Video games about firefighting
Video games about police officers
Simulation video games
Video games developed in Germany
Windows games
Windows-only games
Multiplayer and single-player video games
2006 video games
Sixteen Tons Entertainment games